Gibraltar Hardware is a maker of drumset and percussion hardware. The company sells drumset frames and cages as well as hi-hat stands, drumset thrones, and other products. Artists who use Gibraltar hardware on their drums include Lamb of God's Chris Adler and Luis Conte. Gibraltar hardware packs are standard for current Gretsch Drums kits.

In 2014, the brand became part of Drum Workshop, a family-owned and operated designer and manufacturer of drums and hardware headquartered in Oxnard, California. As of 2022, Gibraltar names Reliance International Corp.(RIC) as the parent company; as does RIC list Gibraltar as a subsidiary brand.

Products

Drum pedals 
Gibraltar sells drum pedals including cajon pedals, double pedals, drum pedal accessories and single pedals.

Drum thrones 
Gibraltar drum thrones include a breathable dry-mesh top and a centered vinyl patch to secure the player in place.
Hi-hat stands
Percussion stands
Practice pads
Racks/Clamps
Speciality stands
Bags/Accessories
Kenny Thompson Model 252A Drumsticks

See also
Drum hardware
Drum hardware pack

References

External links

 About Gibraltar Hardware on Musician Shut website

Percussion instrument manufacturing companies
Drums
Musical instrument manufacturing companies of Gibraltar